D85 may refer to:
 D 85 road (United Arab Emirates)
 Greek destroyer Sfendoni (D85), a Hellenic Navy ship
 HMS Trouncer (D85), a British Royal Navy convoy escort
 Grünfeld Defence, Encyclopaedia of Chess Openings code
 D85 or Delta 85, Halfway point on the Antarctic Plateau between Concordia Base and Dumont D'Urville, used by the aircraft to stop and refuel